Local government elections were held in the thirty-two London boroughs on Thursday 9 May 1968. Polling stations were open between 8am and 9pm.

All seats were up for election. The result was a landslide for the Conservative Party, who won twenty-eight of the boroughs, while Labour lost control of seventeen of the twenty boroughs it had held going into the elections (including Bexley, where it did not win a single seat). Only ten Liberal councillors were elected in London.

The result followed the Conservative gain of the Greater London Council in the elections the previous year.

Until 1978, each council had aldermen, in the ratio of one aldermen to six councillors. Following the elections, each council elected half of its aldermen, who served until 1974. The remaining aldermen had been elected in 1964 and would serve until 1971. This only affected political control in Newham, which remained Labour-held after the election of aldermen.

Results summary

Turnout: 1,876,698 voters cast ballots, a turnout of 35.8%.

Council results

Summary of council election results:

Overall councillor numbers

References

Greater London Assembly – London Borough Council Elections 2006

 
London local elections
1968